Fatigue duty (or fatigue labor) is the labor assigned to military  men that does not require the use of armament. Parties sent on fatigue duty were known in English by the French term "en détachement" according to an 1805 military dictionary.

History 

The term is recorded in America in 1776, and in an 1805 British military dictionary.

United States 

In the United States, the allowance of soldiers employed at work on fortifications, in surveys, in cutting roads, and other constant labor, of not less than ten days, was authorized by an act approved March 2, 1819, entitled An act to regulate the pay of the army when employed on fatigue duty and paid twenty-five cents per day for men employed as ordinary laborers and teamsters, and thirty-five to fifty cents per day for men employed as mechanics, depending on their location.

US soldiers on fatigue duty were allowed an extra gill of whiskey by the act of March 2, 1819. For a time in the 1870s, US Marine Corps company grade officers were supposed to wear an English model "pillbox" or "round cap" for fatigue duty, but it was never popular.

In Article 15 of the US Army Regulations of 1861, correctional custody includes fatigue duties, which is defined as follows:

During the American Civil War, Black soldiers were constantly assigned to fatigue labor, to the point it had become regular slavery. Complaints were made to President Lincoln. Commitments to avoid this discrimination were expressed – General Lorenzo Thomas had released the General Orders 21 outlawing discriminatory fatigue labor – but powerful US army leaders often turned a blind eye to this progressive intention whenever deemed necessary.

See also 

 Corvée
 Fatigue Call

References 

Military life
Military terminology